Delphinidin (also delphinidine) is an anthocyanidin, a primary plant pigment, and also an antioxidant.  Delphinidin gives blue hues to flowers in the genera Viola and Delphinium. It also gives the blue-red color of the grape variety Cabernet Sauvignon, and can be found in cranberries and Concord grapes as well as pomegranates, and bilberries.

Delphinidin, like nearly all other anthocyanidins, is pH-sensitive, i.e. a natural pH indicator, and changes from blue in basic solution to red in acidic solution.

Glycosides 
Several glycosides derived from delphinidin are known:

Myrtillin (delphinidin-3-O-glucoside) and tulipanin (delphinidin-3-O-rutinoside) can be found in blackcurrant pomace.
Violdelphin (delphinidin 3-rutinoside-7-O-(6-O-(4-(6-O-(4-hydroxybenzoyl)-β-D-glucosyl)oxybenzoyl)-β-D-glucoside) is responsible for the purplish-blue flower color of Aconitum chinense.
Nasunin (delphinidin-3-(p-coumaroylrutinoside)-5-glucoside) is responsible for the colour of the eggplant fruit's purple skin.
s including Clitoria ternatea ternatins

See also 
 Prodelphinidin, a type of condensed tannins

References

Anthocyanidins